Petromax is a 2022 Indian Kannada-language comedy drama film written and directed by Vijaya Prasad. The film is produced by Sathish Ninasam and Vijaya Prasad under the banner Sathish Picture House. It stars Sathish Ninasam and Hariprriya alongside Karunya Ram. The story of the film revolves around the lives of four orphans and how they find love in an older woman.

Synopsis
Petromax is a brand name for a type of pressurised paraffin lamp that uses a mantle. Petromax symbolises light, which is essential in the lives of four orphans around whom the plot revolves.

Cast
 Sathish Ninasam as "Oodubatti" Shivappa
 Hariprriya as Meenakshi
 Arun as "Agarbatti" Maadappa
 Nagabhushana as Krishnamurthy
 Karunya Ram as Kavitha Krishnamurthy 
Vijayalakshmi Singh as Sudha Murthy
Sudha Belawadi as L Shanthakumari
Achyuth Kumar as Meenakshi's Father
Padmaja Rao as Meenakshi's Mother
 K S Sridhar as Anathashrama Head
 Ashwin Hassan as Surendranath
Suman Ranganath as Subbalakshmi, Cameo appearance
 Veena Sundar as Petromax, Cameo appearance 
 Mohan Juneja as Rangayana Ragu, Real Estate Agent

Production
Hariprriya was cast for the film in October 2020 alongside Sathish Ninasam. It is Hariprriya's second film with director Vijaya Prasad, after Neer Dose. Principal photography began in October 2020 in Mysore. The filming was 50 percent completed by the end of October 2020. Filming was completed in the first week of January 2021. With the release of trailer on 20 September 2021, the post production work on film was completed. The film was submitted to the Central Board of Film Certification (CBFC) where the film received A certificate.

References

External links 

 

Indian comedy-drama films
Films shot in Mysore
2022 films
2022 comedy-drama films
2020s Kannada-language films
Films scored by Anoop Seelin
Films directed by Vijaya Prasad